Moss is a musical language designed by composer Jackson Moore.  It has a phonology based on elementary melodic distinctions, and a simple lexicon and  grammar inspired by pidgins.  Moore teaches Moss at the unaccredited Bruce High Quality Foundation University.

External links 
Main Site
Bruce High Quality Foundation University
Article on Moss (in Swedish)

Musical languages
Constructed languages